Martin Rypl (born 14 September 1967) is a Czech biathlete. He competed in the men's 20 km individual event at the 1992 Winter Olympics.

References

1967 births
Living people
Czech male biathletes
Olympic biathletes of Czechoslovakia
Biathletes at the 1992 Winter Olympics
Place of birth missing (living people)